The International Kempo Federation (IKF) is the administrative body for kempo in the world, with over 100 member countries. IKF was founded in 2002 in Budapest, Hungary, being currently headquartered in Nice, France.

Presidents 
 Olaf Bock, Germany, 2002–2008
 Jeff Speakman, United States, 2008–2018 
 Amatto Zaharia, Romania, 2018–

Executive committee 
President
  Amatto Zaharia

Vice-presidents 
  Yoshiji Soeno
  Ádám Lacza

CEO public relations
  Bruno Rebelo

Public relations director
  Nishizaka Rei

Head of referees
  Edward Hartman

Executive members
  Robert E. Zingg
  Róbert Szayka

Directors 
  Robert E. Zingg
  Ruslan Akumov 
  Eko Puji Raharjo
  Carlos Miguel Wollman
  Martin Jonsson

Technical advisors
  Velin Hadjolov  
  Rauf Ibrahimov

Members

Events
World Kempo Championships 
Continental Kempo Championships
World Kempo Cups
International Events
Professional IKF Gallas
International Referee Courses

Black Belts Society

9 Dan
  Jeff Speakman
  Benny Urquidez

8 Dan
  Robert E. Zingg
  Amatto Zaharia 
  Olaf Bock
  Edward Hartman  
  Eric La Rocca
  Bruno Rebelo

7 Dan
  Velin Hadjolov  
  Ahmad Yusuf
  Ruslan Akumov 
  Rudolf Várszegi

See also
Kenpō

References

External links
Official website
Old website
 

International Kempo Federation
Sports organizations established in 2002
Organizations based in Nice